Joseph Delteil (21 March 1909 – 7 November 1979) was a French speleologist.

Delteil trained as a carpenter before turning to speleology.

References

External links 
 Association des anciens responsables de la fédération française de spéléologie : In Memoriam.
 N. Casteret, « Joseph Delteil (1909-1979) », Spelunca, Paris, 1980 (1), 1 photographie.
 G. Jauzion, In memoriam Joseph Delteil, in Bulletin de la Société méridionale de spéléologie et de préhistoire, vol. XX, 1980, (pp. 3)
 Joseph Delteil in WESSEX CAVE CLUB
 Joseph Delteil in Rivière Souterraine de Labouiche
 Joseph Delteil in explorations by Norbert Casteret in 1937
 Joseph Delteil mentioned in More Years Under the Earth (1961)

French speleologists
1909 births
People from Ariège (department)
1979 deaths